Willy Bauer is a German former professional motocross racer. He was one of the top racers in the Motocross World Championships of the early 1970s.

In 1973, as a member of the Maico factory racing team, he battled the reigning world champion, Suzuki's Roger De Coster for the 500cc world championship. The title chase went down to the final race in the Netherlands, when Bauer had a mechanical breakdown, losing the championship by two points. After falling to sixth place in the 1974 500cc world championship, he signed a contract in 1975 to race for the Suzuki factory racing team in the 250cc class. Bauer ended the season in third place behind Harry Everts and Hakan Andersson.

Bauer moved back to the 500cc class with the KTM factory racing team in 1976 and placed tenth in the world championship. After a 12th-place finish in 1977, he signed a contract to race for the Sachs factory in the 1978 250cc world championship. At the 1978 British motocross Grand Prix held at Kilmartin, Scotland, Bauer crashed and had spinal cord injuries that left him paralyzed.

References

German motocross riders
People with paraplegia
Living people
Year of birth missing (living people)
Place of birth missing (living people)